The First Corps is a Syrian rebel coalition active during the Syrian Civil War. It is part of the western backed Syrian rebel Southern Front. On 13 April 2015, it joined a number of other Southern Front affiliates in condemning al-Nusra's ideology and discontinuing all forms of cooperation with it.

See also
List of armed groups in the Syrian Civil War

References

External links

Anti-government factions of the Syrian civil war
Free Syrian Army